Leonardo Alves Chú Franco (born 6 April 2000), known as Léo Chú, is a Brazilian professional footballer who plays as a winger for Major League Soccer club Seattle Sounders FC.

Club career

Grêmio
Léo Chú was born in Porto Alegre, Rio Grande do Sul, and joined Grêmio's youth setup at the age of ten. On 5 February 2020, he renewed his contract until the end of 2024.

Ceará (loan)
On 10 February 2020, Léo Chú was loaned to fellow Série A side Ceará until the end of the season. He made his senior debut twelve days later, coming on as a second-half substitute for Wescley in a 1–0 Campeonato Cearense home win against Caucaia.

Léo Chú made his top tier debut occurred on 12 October 2020, as he started in a 2–1 home success over Corinthians. He scored his first goal in the category on 25 November, netting the equalizer in a 1–1 home draw against São Paulo.

2021 season
Back to Grêmio for the 2021 campaign, Léo Chú made his debut for the club on 14 March, starting in a 2–0 Campeonato Gaúcho away win against Esportivo. Late in the month, he scored the equalizer in a 2–2 draw at São Luiz-RS.

Seattle Sounders FC

On August 5, 2021, Léo Chú signed with Seattle Sounders FC of Major League Soccer. He made his debut for the club on September 14, coming on as a substitute and providing an assist to Raúl Ruidíaz's goal in stoppage time to win a Leagues Cup semifinal against Santos Laguna. Chú made his MLS debut on September 29 against the San Jose Earthquakes with another substitute appearance.

Career statistics

Honours
Grêmio
Campeonato Gaúcho: 2021
Recopa Gaúcha: 2021

Seattle Sounders FC
CONCACAF Champions League: 2022

References

External links
Ceará profile 

2000 births
Living people
Footballers from Porto Alegre
Brazilian footballers
Association football forwards
Campeonato Brasileiro Série A players
Grêmio Foot-Ball Porto Alegrense players
Ceará Sporting Club players
Seattle Sounders FC players
Major League Soccer players
Brazilian expatriate footballers
Brazilian expatriate sportspeople in the United States